Concertgebouw may refer to one of the following concert halls:

 Concertgebouw, Amsterdam, Netherlands 
 Concertgebouw, Bruges, Belgium
 Concertgebouw de Vereeniging, Netherlands 

Buildings and structures disambiguation pages